State Route 537 (SR 537) is a short east–west state highway in southeastern Ohio.

Route description
For its entire length, the state highway follows a hilly, curvey routing through Wayne National Forest, with the occasional home and patch of open space. From the SR 260 intersection, SR 537 runs northeasterly, then bends in a "U" shape through an open field within an otherwise forested region, heading south and back to the north, then resumes a northeasterly path before curving to the north. SR 537 straddles the boundary between Bethel Township and Washington Township up through the CR 13 intersection, before weaving its way in a generally southeasterly trend to the Township Highway 307 intersection. SR 537 turns easterly there, then bends back to the northeast.

State Route 537 is not included as a part of the National Highway System.

History
SR 537 was first designated in 1937 along the routing that it currently occupies between SR 260 and SR 26. No major changes have taken place to the state highway since its creation.

Major intersections

References

537
Transportation in Monroe County, Ohio